Fimbristylis hirsutifolia is a critically endangered species of fimbry found only in India. It is endemic to the Malappuram district of the state of Kerala.

References

hirsutifolia
Flora of Kerala